Aphnelepis is an extinct genus of prehistoric bony fish that lived during the Middle Jurassic epoch.

See also

 Prehistoric fish
 List of prehistoric bony fish

References

Middle Jurassic fish
Prehistoric fish of Australia